Baenidae is an extinct family of paracryptodiran turtles known from the Early Cretaceous to Eocene of North America. While during the Early Cretaceous they are found across North America, during the Late Cretaceous they are only found in Laramidia, having disappeared from Appalachia. The majority of lineages survived the K-Pg Extinction, but the family was extinct by the latest Eocene. The name of the type genus, Baena, appears to be of Native American origin. They are primarily found in freshwater deposits, and are considered to be aquatic, with a largely generalist habit.

Genera
 †Arundelemys
 †Arvinachelys
 †Baena
 †Cedrobaena
 †Chisternon
 †Edowa
 †Gamerabaena
 †Hayemys
 †Lakotemys Lakota Formation, Berriasian-Valanginian
 †Neurankylus
 †Palatobaena
 †Peckemys
 †Plesiobaena
 †Protobaena
 †Saxochelys
 †Stygiochelys
 †Thescelus
 †Trinitichelys

Classification

The following cladogram shows the taxonomy and phylogeny of baenids according to Joyce & Lyson (2015).

References

External links
 http://www.nhm.org/site/sites/default/files/dinosaur_institute/pdf/NHM_DI_proytecto_dino_Erika_Canola_Baenidae_Turtle_experience.pdf

 
Prehistoric reptile families
Jurassic first appearances
Eocene extinctions
Taxa named by Edward Drinker Cope